Buoyancy control may refer to:

Buoyancy control of scuba divers
Buoyancy control of surface supplied divers
The scuba diving skill of buoyancy control